Olga-Afroditi Piliaki (born ) is a Greek group rhythmic gymnast. She represents her nation at international competitions. 

She participated at the 2008 Summer Olympics in Beijing. 
She also competed at world championships, including at the 2005 and 2007 World Rhythmic Gymnastics Championships.

She dance 2012 at the Eurovision stage backing Ivi Adamou representing Cyprus.

2018 she participated at the Greek version of Dancing with the stars.

References

External links

1989 births
Living people
Greek rhythmic gymnasts
Place of birth missing (living people)
Gymnasts at the 2008 Summer Olympics
Olympic gymnasts of Greece